Farm Neck Golf Club is a semi-private golf club located in Oak Bluffs, Massachusetts on the island of Martha's Vineyard. The course was designed in 1979 by Geoffrey Cornish, Bill Robinson, and Patrick Mulligan. Farm Neck has been one of the top-ranked courses in the northeast United States and has consistently been ranked 4.5 out of 5 stars in Golf Digest's "Best Places to Play". Originally starting out as only 9 holes, the course eventually expanded into the 18-hole course that it is today. Noted for the beauty of its topography, it has been cited as the best public golf course in New England. The course received media attention when President Bill Clinton played there while on vacation in 1993, and again when President Barack Obama played a round of golf there while vacationing in August 2009. In addition, the clubhouse now has a cafe serving breakfast, lunch, and dinner as well as tennis courts.

Layout
Farm Neck Golf Club contains an 18-hole course and a driving range. All yardage is assumed to be from the gold tees.

References

Golf clubs and courses in Massachusetts
Tourist attractions in Oak Bluffs, Massachusetts
Buildings and structures in Dukes County, Massachusetts